Robert Gerwarth (born 12 February 1976) is a German historian and author who specialises in European history, with an emphasis on German history. Since finishing a British Academy Postdoctoral Fellowship at the University of Oxford, he has held fellowships at Princeton, Harvard, the NIOD (Amsterdam) and the Institute for Advanced Studies at the University of Western Australia. He teaches at University College Dublin (UCD), Ireland.

Career
Born in Berlin, Gerwarth earned a master's degree in history and politics from Humboldt University of Berlin in 2000. While working on his doctorate at the University of Oxford, Gerwarth was appointed to a two-year lectureship in modern European history. Shortly thereafter, he was awarded a British Academy postdoctoral fellowship. In 2003, Gerwarth received his Doctor of Philosophy from Oxford. Gerwarth is currently Director of the Centre for War Studies at University College Dublin. He is also Head of the School of History, a position that has a three-year duration, his term began in 2017. In 2008, Gerwarth debated Holocaust-denier David Irving on Irish television.

Gerwarth has been commended for the thoroughness of his research on Reinhard Heydrich in his book Hitler's Hangman: The Life of Heydrich. Heydrich did not leave behind a substantive paper trail. Reviews have noted Gerwarth's diligence in digging through archives and other sources in the United States and Ireland in order to uncover the nature of his subject. Gerwarth is credited with dispelling several myths about Heydrich, verifying that Heydrich was not Jewish and that he was a relative latecomer to membership in the Nazi Party.

Gerwarth's other scholarly work has been published widely in international journals such as The Journal of Modern History, Past & Present,  and Vingtième Siècle. He is series editor for the Oxford University Press monograph series, The Greater War, 1912–23, to be released during the centenary of the First World War.

Personal
Gerwarth was raised during the final years of the Cold War in Berlin, Germany. At age 13, he witnessed the fall of the Berlin Wall. Gerwarth says that living in such a significant historical city sparked his interest in European history. Of his career path, Gerwarth says: "I have no regrets in following this career path; I love being a historian." Other hobbies include skiing, rowing and reading for pleasure. Gerwarth currently lives in Ireland with his wife and two sons.

Published works

Edited volumes
 Empires at War: 1911-1923. Oxford: Oxford University Press. 2014.
War in Peace: Paramilitary Violence in Europe After the Great War. Oxford University Press, 2013.(with John Horne)
 (with D. Bloxham)

 (with D. Geppert)
 (with H.G. Haupt)
 (with J. Harris and H. Nehring)

References

External links
 Gerwarth's staff page at UCD.

Living people
21st-century German historians
Historians of Germany
Historians of the Holocaust
1976 births